Ballads, Blues and Boasters is an album by Harry Belafonte, released by RCA Victor in 1964.

Track listing 
 "Tone the Bell Easy" – 3:20	
 "Blue Willow Moan" (Bill Eaton) – 3:35	
 "Ananias" – 2:50	
 "Boy" (G. Tipton, Joe Tinker Lewis) – 3:49	
 "My Love Is a Dewdrop" (Mark Spoelstra) – 3:25	
 "Back of the Bus" – 3:25	
 "Pastures of Plenty" (Woody Guthrie) – 3:38	
 "John the Revelator" (Traditional, Carver Neblett) – 3:41	
 "Four Strong Winds" (Ian Tyson) – 2:54	
 "Black Betty" (Traditional, Kaye Dunham) – 4:14	
 "Big Boat Up the River" – 4:06

Personnel 
 Harry Belafonte – vocals
 Ernie Calabria – guitar
 Jay Berliner – guitar
 John Cartwright – bass
 Percy Brice – drums
 Ralph MacDonald – percussion
 Paul Griffin – organ
Production notes:
 Orchestra and chorus conducted by Howard A. Roberts
 Bob Bollard – producer
 Priscilla Eaves – producer
 Bob Simpson – engineer
 Ed Begley – tape mastering
 Peter Perri – cover photo

Chart positions

References 

1964 albums
Harry Belafonte albums
RCA Records albums
Albums conducted by Howard Roberts